is the Hindu goddess of felicity and sanguineness. She is also the consort of Hindu god Brihaspati, the god of planet Jupiter. According to some Puranas, Tara sired or mothered a child named Budha, the god of Mercury through Chandra and had a son named Kacha through Brihaspati.

Story

Tara was the wife of Brihaspati, the guru of Devas. According to historians, it is mentioned as her husband spent most of his time with the problems and matters of Devas, she felt being ignored by her husband. One day, Chandra, the moon god visited Brihaspati. There he saw Tara and was captivated by her beauty. Chandra used Hypnosis on Tara.

Brihaspati was infuriated and demanded Chandra to return his wife. Chandra told Brihaspati that Tara was happy and satisfied with him. He told that how can an old man be husband of a young woman. This made Brihaspati more annoyed and he warned Chandra for battle. Indra and other Devas gathered to fight a war. Chandra was not ready to give Tara back and he took help from the Asuras and their preceptor, Sukra. The Devas were assisted by Shiva and his companions. Devas and Asura were about to fight a war, but Brahma, the creator god, stopped them and convinced Chandra to return Tara. In some versions, Shiva stopped the war.

After some time, Brihaspati found out that Tara was pregnant and questioned her who the father of the child was. But Tara remained silent. After the boy was born, both Chandra and Brihaspati claimed to be his father. Tara revealed it was Chandra's son. The boy was named Budha.

See also
Nairatmya
Praises to the Twenty-One Taras
Tara (Devi)
Tara (Buddhism)

References

Dowson's Classical Dictionary of Hindu Mythology

External links
http://mythfolklore.net/india/encyclopedia/taraka.htm

Hindu goddesses
Salakapurusa
Characters in the Mahabharata